Lead(II) chloride (PbCl2) is an inorganic compound which is a white solid under ambient conditions. It is poorly soluble in water. Lead(II) chloride is one of the most important lead-based reagents. It also occurs naturally in the form of the mineral cotunnite.

Structure and properties
In solid PbCl2, each lead ion is coordinated by nine chloride ions in a tricapped triangular prism formation — six lie at the vertices of a triangular prism and three lie beyond the centers of each rectangular prism face. The 9 chloride ions are not equidistant from the central lead atom, 7 lie at 280–309 pm and 2 at 370 pm. PbCl2 forms white orthorhombic needles.

In the gas phase, PbCl2 molecules have a bent structure with the Cl–Pb–Cl angle being 98° and each Pb–-Cl bond distance being 2.44 Å. Such PbCl2 is emitted from internal combustion engines that use ethylene chloride-tetraethyllead additives for antiknock purposes.

PbCl2 is sparingly soluble in water, solubility product Ksp =  at 20 °C. It is one of only 5 commonly water-insoluble chlorides, the other 4 being thallium(I) chloride, silver chloride (AgCl) with Ksp = , copper(I) chloride (CuCl) with Ksp =  and mercury(I) chloride (Hg2Cl2) with Ksp = .

Synthesis

Solid lead(II) chloride precipitates upon addition of aqueous chloride sources (HCl, NaCl, KCl) to aqueous solutions of lead(II) compounds, such as lead(II) nitrate and lead(II) acetate:

It also forms by treatment of basic lead(II) compounds such as **Lead(II) oxide and lead(II) carbonate.

Lead dioxide is reduced by chloride as follows:

It also  formed by the oxidation of lead metal by copper(II) chloridel:

Or most straightforwardly by the action of chlorine gas on lead metal:

Reactions
Addition of chloride ions to a suspension of PbCl2 gives rise to soluble complex ions. In these reactions the additional chloride (or other ligands) break up the chloride bridges that comprise the polymeric framework of solid PbCl2(s).
PbCl2(s) + Cl− → [PbCl3]−(aq)
PbCl2(s) + 2 Cl− → [PbCl4]2−(aq)

PbCl2 reacts with molten NaNO2 to give PbO:
PbCl2(l) + 3 NaNO2 → PbO + NaNO3 + 2 NO + 2 NaCl

PbCl2 is used in synthesis of lead(IV) chloride (PbCl4): Cl2 is bubbled through a saturated solution of PbCl2 in aqueous NH4Cl forming [NH4]2[PbCl6]. The latter is reacted with cold concentrated sulfuric acid (H2SO4) forming PbCl4 as an oil.

Lead(II) chloride is the main precursor for organometallic derivatives of lead, such as plumbocenes. The usual alkylating agents are employed, including Grignard reagents and organolithium compounds:
2 PbCl2 + 4 RLi → R4Pb + 4 LiCl + Pb
2 PbCl2 + 4 RMgBr → R4Pb + Pb + 4 MgBrCl
3 PbCl2 + 6 RMgBr → R3Pb-PbR3 + Pb + 6 MgBrCl

These reactions produce derivatives that are more similar to organosilicon compounds, i.e. that Pb(II) tends to disproportionate upon alkylation.

PbCl2 can be used to produce PbO2 by treating it with sodium hypochlorite (NaClO), forming a reddish-brown precipitate of PbO2.

Uses
Molten PbCl2 is used in the synthesis of lead titanate and barium lead titanate ceramics by cation replacement reactions:
x PbCl2(l) + BaTiO3(s) → Ba1−xPbxTiO3 + x BaCl2
PbCl2 is used in production of infrared transmitting glass, and ornamental glass called aurene glass. Aurene glass has an iridescent surface formed by spraying with PbCl2 and reheating under controlled conditions. Stannous chloride (SnCl2) is used for the same purpose.
Pb is used in HCl service even though the PbCl2 formed is slightly soluble in HCl. Addition of 6–25% of antimony (Sb) increases corrosion resistance.
A basic chloride of lead, PbCl2·Pb(OH)2, is known as Pattinson's white lead and is used as pigment in white paint. Lead paint is now banned as a health hazard in many countries by the White Lead (Painting) Convention, 1921.
PbCl2 is an intermediate in refining bismuth (Bi) ore. The ore containing Bi, Pb, and Zn is first treated with molten caustic soda to remove traces of arsenic and tellurium. This is followed by the Parkes process to remove any silver and gold present. There are now Bi, Pb, and Zn in the ore. At 500 °C, it receives treatment from Cl2 gas. First, ZnCl2 forms and is excreted. Pure Bi is left behind after PbCl2 forms and is eliminated. Lastly, BiCl3 would form.

Toxicity
Like other soluble lead compounds, exposure to PbCl2 may cause lead poisoning.

References

External links

IARC Monograph: "Lead and Lead Compounds"
IARC Monograph: "Inorganic and Organic Lead Compounds"
National Pollutant Inventory – Lead and Lead Compounds Fact Sheet
Case Studies in Environmental Medicine – Lead Toxicity
ToxFAQs: Lead

Lead(II) compounds
Chlorides
Metal halides
IARC Group 2A carcinogens